Irrgang is a surname. Notable people with the surname include:

Annegret Irrgang, married Annegret Richter, (born 1950), German sprinter
Detlef Irrgang (born 1966), German footballer
Fritz Emil Irrgang (1890 1951), German politician and member of the Nazi Party
Ewout Irrgang (born 1976), Dutch politician, anti-globalization activist and banking employee
Pablo Irrgang (born 1972), Argentinian sculptor